Cristiano Minellono (born 27 March 1946) is an Italian songwriter and actor. He is also known as Popi Minellono.

Life and career 
Born in Arona, Piedmont, Minellono debuted as a lyricist in 1967, with the song "È ancora giorno", performed by Shirley Bassey. In 1968 he got his first successes, Patrick Samson's "Soli si muore" and Dik Dik's "Il primo giorno di Primavera". After further hits for Umberto Balsamo, Nomadi and Wess & Dori Ghezzi, in 1980 he started a fruitful collaboration as producer and lyricist with Toto Cutugno and Adriano Celentano, notably writing the lyrics for Cutugno's major hit "L'Italiano".

In the first half of the 1980s, Minellono was the usual lyricist for Al Bano and Romina Power's and Ricchi e Poveri's songs, contributing to relaunching their careers. Two of his songs won the Sanremo Music Festival, in 1984 Al Bano and Romina's "Ci sarà" and in 1985 Ricchi e Poveri's "Se m'innamoro".

Also active as a  creative director, since early 1980s Minellono collaborated as a television writer to numerous Fininvest and later Mediaset television programmes.

References

External links

 

1946 births
Living people
People from Arona, Piedmont
Italian lyricists
Italian songwriters
Male songwriters
Italian record producers
Italian television writers
Male television writers